Allentown Historic District may refer to:

Allentown Historic District (Allentown, New Jersey), listed on the NRHP in New Jersey
Allentown Historic District (Buffalo, New York), listed on the NRHP in New York